Smbat, Sambat, Smpad or Sempad may refer to:

 Smbat IV Bagratuni (died 616/7), Armenian noble in Byzantine and Sasanian service, marzpan of Hyrcania and Armenia
 Smbat VI Bagratuni (died 726), presiding prince of Armenia
 Smbat VII Bagratuni (died 775), presiding prince of Armenia
 Smbat I (850–912), Smbat the Martyr, king of Armenia from 890 to 912
 Smbat II, king of Armenia from 977 to 990
 Smbat III (died 1042), king of Armenia from 1020 to 1040. Also known as Hovhannes-Smbat of Ani.
 Sempad the Constable (1208–1276), noble in the Armenian Kingdom of Cilicia. Diplomat, judge, historian and military commander, brother of King Hetoum I
 Sempad, King of Armenia (1277–1310), king of the Armenian Kingdom of Cilicia from 1296 to 1298
 Smbat Shahaziz (1840–1908), Armenian poet
 Smpad Piurad (1862–1915), Armenian writer and victim of the Armenian Genocide
 Smbat Baroyan (1875–1956), Armenian fedayee commander during the Armenian national movement
 Smbat Lputian (born 1958), Armenian chess grandmaster
 Sambat is sometimes considered to have been used as the Khazar name for Kiev
 Sam Bat, a Canadian manufacturer of baseball bats
 Smbat Walls, a historical fortification in Armenia

See also
 Symbatios (disambiguation)